Hits Made Famous by Country Queens is a compilation album by Faye Tucker and Dolly Parton. It was released on April 13, 1963, by budget record label Somerset Records. The album features Tucker singing four selections made famous by Patsy Cline, plus one original song. Parton sings three selections made famous by Kitty Wells, along with two traditional ballads and one original song. The album was made available for digital download on May 11, 2018.

Track listing

References

Dolly Parton compilation albums
1963 compilation albums